Seema Dwivedi is an Indian politician and Member of Parliament in the Rajya Sabha from Uttar Pradesh. She is a former member of the Uttar Pradesh Legislative Assembly from the Mungra Badshahpur constituency in Jaunpur district.  She is a member of the Bharatiya Janata Party

References 

People from Jaunpur district
Bharatiya Janata Party politicians from Uttar Pradesh
Members of the Uttar Pradesh Legislative Assembly
Living people
21st-century Indian politicians
Rajya Sabha members from Uttar Pradesh
1970 births